Patty Fendick and Zina Garrison-Jackson were the defending champions but they competed with different partners that year, Fendick with Meredith McGrath and Garrison-Jackson with Lori McNeil.

Garrison-Jackson and McNeil lost in the semifinals to Katrina Adams and Manon Bollegraf.

Fendick and Garrison-Jackson won in the final 7–6, 6–2 against Adams and Bollegraf.

Seeds
Champion seeds are indicated in bold text while text in italics indicates the round in which those seeds were eliminated.

 Patty Fendick /  Meredith McGrath (champions)
 Zina Garrison-Jackson /  Lori McNeil (semifinals)
 Katrina Adams /  Manon Bollegraf (final)
 Ann Grossman /  Julie Richardson (first round)

Draw

External links
 1994 IGA Classic Doubles Draw

U.S. National Indoor Championships
1994 WTA Tour